The 1998 Race of Champions took place on December 6 at Gran Canaria. It was the 11th running of the event, and the 7th running at Gran Canaria. It was the final year that the event was exclusively for rally drivers. Colin McRae was the victor after beating brother Alister in the final.

Participants

Legends Race
 Björn Waldegård & Timo Salonen eliminated in the First Round.

International Masters

Race of Champions

External links
Information sourced from http://www.atodomotor.com/pagina/ROC.html

1998
1998 in motorsport
1998 in Spanish motorsport
International sports competitions hosted by Spain
1998,Race of Champions